MLW Underground TV is a professional wrestling television series that was produced by Major League Wrestling (MLW) from 2003 to 2004. The series was hosted by former Extreme Championship Wrestling (ECW) commentator Joey Styles. 

Reruns of the series began airing in the Summer of 2020 on BeIN Sports USA.

The Underground name was revived for the weekly series titled MLW Underground Wrestling, that premiered on February 7, 2023.

History
Underground TV episodes consisted of pre-taped matches from prior MLW events.

In late 2003, MLW released episodes of Underground TV on DVD. Unlike the on-air broadcast, the DVDs contain full-length matches from the television tapings. It also contained backstage interviews from before and after the event.

See also

List of professional wrestling television series

References

External links

2003 American television series debuts
2003 American television series endings
American professional wrestling television series
Underground TV